Comfort and Joy may be:

 A lyric from the Christmas carol God Rest You Merry, Gentlemen
Comfort and Joy (1984 film), directed by Bill Forsyth
Comfort and Joy (album), soundtrack album to the film
Comfort and Joy (2003 film), starring Nancy McKeon
"Comfort and Joy" (Justice League episode), an episode of the animated series
Comfort & Joy, an album by a cappella group Rockapella
"Comfort and Joy", an a cappella arrangement of "God Rest Ye Merry Gentlemen" from Old Friends (1997 Simon and Garfunkel album)
Comfort & Joy, an extended play by Tinashe